Jesse "BUGA" King is an Nigerian musician who primarily sings in the Yoruba language, with his songs featuring aspects of the Yoruba culture and its proverbs. In 2016, he advocated support for Nigerian president Muhammadu Buhari, in an effort to help stabilize Nigeria's economy.

Musical career 
He released his first album in 2006 named BUGA. Before then, he used to do radio jingles, and he also worked as a producer. He once worked for Ekiti and Ondo state Broadcasting Corporation. King is an Auchi-born musician but lived in Lagos. His musicals are mostly popular among the Yoruba People of Nigeria, especially Ondo state. He studied in Ondo state University (now relocated to Akungba-Akoko as Adekunle Ajasin University in 1999).

References

Living people
Yoruba-language singers
Nigerian male musicians
Adekunle Ajasin University alumni
21st-century Nigerian male  singers
People from Auchi
Year of birth missing (living people)